The La Blanche Apartments is a historic building in West Philadelphia built in 1910 in the Georgian Revival style.  It was part of the second wave of a housing boom in West Philadelphia that started with the completion of the Market Street Elevated line in 1907.  The building is also one of the first large apartment buildings built in Philadelphia, and helped give the rising middle class better access to housing.  Originally the four story building housed just 26 apartments, but as the neighborhood became less fashionable, the apartments were subdivided into a total of 49 units.

References

Apartment buildings in Pennsylvania
Residential buildings on the National Register of Historic Places in Philadelphia
Georgian Revival architecture in Pennsylvania
Residential buildings completed in 1910
West Philadelphia